The W.C. Clemmons Mound is a Native American mound in the south central portion of the U.S. state of Ohio. Located near the unincorporated community of Fox, it lies in the middle of a farm field near a creek.

The mound is significant as a potential archaeological site.  Although it has never been excavated, its location has led archaeologists to conclude that it was built by people of the Adena culture, who constructed many burial mounds for their leaders; typical Adena mounds contain log tombs that house the bodies of high-ranking members of society along with plentiful grave goods.  Because the mound has never been excavated, it is exceedingly well preserved; perhaps no other mound in Pickaway County has been so little changed since the region was settled.

In 1974, the Clemmons mound was listed on the National Register of Historic Places, due to its archaeological value.

References

Adena culture
Archaeological sites in Ohio
Archaeological sites on the National Register of Historic Places in Ohio
Geography of Pickaway County, Ohio
National Register of Historic Places in Pickaway County, Ohio
Mounds in Ohio